Events in the year 1956 in Portugal.

Incumbents
President: Francisco Craveiro Lopes
Prime Minister: António de Oliveira Salazar

Events
11–12 February – A cold spell across the country causes four deaths and sees Lisbon experience its coldest day of the 20th century, with the newspaper Diário de Lisboa reporting temperatures of –2°C in the early hours of 12 February.

Arts and entertainment

Sports

Births

23 March – José Manuel Barroso, politician
29 June – Pedro Santana Lopes, politician
15 October – Maria da Assunção Esteves, politician, Member of the European Parliament.

Deaths
27 October – Domingos Leite Pereira, politician (b. 1880).
11 November – António Ferro, writer and politician (b. 1895).

References

 
1950s in Portugal
Years of the 20th century in Portugal
Portugal
Portugal